Gordon Desmond Muirhead (March 23, 1923 – May 2, 2002) was an English-born American golf course designer.

Early life
Desmond Muirhead was born on March 23, 1923 in Norwich, England. He graduated from the University of Cambridge, the University of British Columbia and the University of Oregon.

Career
Muirhead designed many golf courses, including the Dinah Shore Tournament Course at the Mission Hills Country Club in Rancho Mirage, California. With Jack Nicklaus, he designed Muirfield Village in Dublin, Ohio.

According to the Honolulu Advertiser, he "became one of the most respected golf course designers" in the United States. An article in Golf Digest suggested that Muirhead "showed chutzpah in drawing inspiration from art, literature and Mother Nature but went off the deep end with fish bunkers and mermaid holes."

Personal life and death
Muirhead had a wife, Helen, and three daughters. They resided in Newport Beach, California, where he died on May 2, 2002.

References

1923 births
2002 deaths
Architects from Norwich
People from Newport Beach, California
British emigrants to the United States
Alumni of the University of Cambridge
University of British Columbia alumni
University of Oregon alumni
Golf course architects